The Central Roller Mills is a historic mill complex in Central, South Carolina.  The mill opened in 1903, when there were 556 operating grist mills and roller mills in South Carolina.  By 1929 there were only 23, and by 1939 there were only 17, however the Central Roller Mills operated until the late 1970s.  The original building is three stories tall and made of brick, with a one-story wing.  The mill was purchased by the owner of the nearby Pendleton Oil Mill in 1934.  By 1938, additions to the complex included a second story to the wing, a four-story tower for bucket elevators, and a three-story tower with nine storage silos.  A corn mill and hammer mill for producing animal feed were added in separate buildings.  The complex was listed on the National Register of Historic Places in 2013.

References

National Register of Historic Places in Pickens County, South Carolina
Industrial buildings and structures on the National Register of Historic Places in South Carolina
Industrial buildings completed in 1903
Buildings and structures in Pickens County, South Carolina
Central, South Carolina